Love Story is a 2012 Maldivian romantic film directed by Abdul Faththaah. Produced by Hussain Nooradeen under Noor N Movies, the film stars Ali Seezan, Amira Ismail and Aishath Rishmy in pivotal roles. The film was released on 28 March 2012.

Cast 
 Ali Seezan as Ahmed Althaf Shair
 Amira Ismail as Rishfa
 Aishath Rishmy as Hana
 Roanu Hassan Manik as Ahammad
 Mohamed Faisal as Niyaz
 Mohamed Manik as Zahid
 Sheela Najeeb as Afiya
 Ali Shameel as Rishfa's father
 Ahmed Saeed as Iqbal; Althaf's brother
 Aminath Shareef as Hana's mother
 Ismail Zahir (special appearance)
 Khadheeja Ibrahim Didi as a nurse (special appearance)

Soundtrack

Release and reception
The film received negative response from critics. Ahmed Nadheem of Haveeru noted the film as "another boring, slow paced" Maldivian film which lacks originality. Displeased with the screenplay and performance of the film, he wrote: "None of the actors were given scope to build their characters and none was able to justify their character. With excessive emotional scenes, actors were exposed to over-acting and nothing more". The cinematography of few songs were noted to be the only saving grace of the film.

Accolades

References

2012 films
2012 romance films
Maldivian romance films
Films directed by Abdul Faththaah